The men's 4000 metres steeplechase was a track & field athletics event at the 1900 Summer Olympics in Paris. It was the one of the first two times that a steeplechase race was held at the Olympics, with the 2500 metres version held one day earlier. The 4000 metres steeplechase was held on July 16, 1900. The race was held on a track of 500 metres in circumference. Eight athletes from five nations competed in the longer of the two steeplechase events. The three medallists from the 2500 metre steeplechase also competed in the 4000.  The only one among them to win a second medal was Sidney Robinson, who added a bronze medal to the silver he had won earlier. The gold medal was won by John Rimmer of Great Britain, which completed a medal sweep with Rimmer, silver medalist Charles Bennett, and Robinson.

Background

This was the second Olympic steeplechase race (one day after the first), and the only time that an Olympic steeplechase race was held over the distance of 4000 metres. The 4000 metres was the longest distance of any Olympic steeplechase. The 1900 Games introduced steeplechase events with this competition and the 2500 metres steeplechase. The next two Games would each feature a steeplechase, but at different distances: 2590 metres in 1904 and 3200 metres in 1908. There was no steeplechase event in 1912. After World War I, the now-standard 3000 metres steeplechase was introduced and has been held at every Games since. Women's steeplechase, also at 3000 metres, was added in 2008.

Competition format

This steeplechase event featured a single race. The competition involved eight laps of the 500 metre track, complete with standard hurdles as well as stone fences and a water jump. The course was the same as that of the shorter event, but with eight laps instead of five.

Records

None, this was the first and only time the event was held.

Schedule

Results

The British trio dominated this race, finishing in the top three spots close together. Rimmer was in front the whole way. Grant trailed him closely until the final lap before falling to the back of the field and eventually abandoning the race. The fourth-place finisher was about four times as far behind Robinson as Robinson was behind Rimmer. Orton, the gold medalist of the first steeplechase, finished fifth; he had become ill with an intestinal virus overnight and was unable to make the final push that had served him well in the 2500 metres.

References

Sources
 International Olympic Committee.
 De Wael, Herman. Herman's Full Olympians: "Athletics 1900". Accessed 18 March 2006.
 

Men's steeplechase 4000 metres
Steeplechase at the Olympics